Citrus is a genus of flowering trees and shrubs in the rue family, Rutaceae. Plants in the genus produce citrus fruits, including important crops such as oranges, lemons, grapefruits, pomelos, and limes. The genus Citrus is native to South Asia, East Asia, Southeast Asia, Melanesia, and Australia. Various citrus species have been used and domesticated by indigenous cultures in these areas since ancient times. From there its cultivation spread into Micronesia and Polynesia by the Austronesian expansion (c. 3000–1500 BCE); and to the Middle East and the Mediterranean (c. 1200 BCE) via the incense trade route, and onwards to Europe and the Americas.

History 
Citrus plants are native to subtropical and tropical regions of Asia, Island Southeast Asia, Near Oceania, and northeastern Australia. Domestication of citrus species involved much hybridization and introgression, leaving much uncertainty about when and where domestication first happened. A genomic, phylogenic, and biogeographical analysis by Wu et al. (2018) has shown that the center of origin of the genus Citrus is likely the southeast foothills of the Himalayas, in a region stretching from eastern Assam, northern Myanmar, to western Yunnan. It diverged from a common ancestor with Poncirus trifoliata. A change in climate conditions during the Late Miocene (11.63 to 5.33 mya) resulted in a sudden speciation event. The species resulting from this event include the citrons (Citrus medica) of South Asia; the pomelos (C. maxima) of Mainland Southeast Asia; the mandarins (C. reticulata), kumquats (C. japonica), mangshanyegan (C. mangshanensis), and ichang papedas (C. cavaleriei) of southeastern China; the kaffir limes (C. hystrix) of Island Southeast Asia; and the biasong and samuyao (C. micrantha) of the Philippines. 

This was later followed by the spread of citrus species into Taiwan and Japan in the Early Pliocene (5.33 to 3.6 mya), resulting in the tachibana orange (C. tachibana); and beyond the Wallace Line into Papua New Guinea and Australia during the Early Pleistocene (2.5 million to 800,000 years ago), where further speciation events occurred resulting in the Australian limes.

The earliest introductions of citrus species by human migrations was during the Austronesian expansion (c. 3000–1500 BCE), where Citrus hystrix, Citrus macroptera, and Citrus maxima were among the canoe plants carried by Austronesian voyagers eastwards into Micronesia and Polynesia.

The citron (Citrus medica) was also introduced early into the Mediterranean basin from India and Southeast Asia. It was introduced via two ancient trade routes: an overland route through Persia, the Levant and the Mediterranean islands; and a maritime route through the Arabian Peninsula and Ptolemaic Egypt into North Africa. Although the exact date of the original introduction is unknown due to the sparseness of archaeobotanical remains, the earliest evidence are seeds recovered from the Hala Sultan Tekke site of Cyprus, dated to around 1200 BCE. Other archaeobotanical evidence include pollen from Carthage dating back to the 4th century BCE; and carbonized seeds from Pompeii dated to around the 3rd to 2nd century BCE. The earliest complete description of the citron was first attested from Theophrastus, c. 310 BCE. The agronomists of classical Rome made many references to the cultivation of citrus fruits within the limits of their empire.

Lemons, pomelos, and sour oranges are believed to have been introduced to the Mediterranean later by Arab traders at around the 10th century CE; and sweet oranges by the Genoese and Portuguese from Asia during the 15th to 16th century. Mandarins were not introduced until the 19th century. This group of species has reached great importance in some of the Mediterranean countries, and in the case of orange, mandarin, and lemon trees, they found here soil and climatic conditions which allow them to achieve a high level of fruit quality, even better than in the regions from where they came.

Oranges were introduced to Florida by Spanish colonists.

In cooler parts of Europe, citrus fruit was grown in orangeries starting in the 17th century; many were as much status symbols as functional agricultural structures.

Etymology 
The generic name originated from Latin, where it referred to either the plant now known as citron (C. medica) or a conifer tree (Thuja). It is related to the ancient Greek word for cedar, κέδρος (kédros). This may be due to perceived similarities in the smell of citrus leaves and fruit with that of cedar. Collectively, Citrus fruits and plants are also known by the Romance loanword agrumes (literally "sour fruits").

Evolution 
The large citrus fruit of today evolved originally from small, edible berries over millions of years. Citrus species began to diverge from a common ancestor about 15 million years ago, at about the same time that Severinia (such as the Chinese box orange) diverged from the same ancestor. About 7 million years ago, the ancestors of Citrus split into the main genus, Citrus, and the genus Poncirus (such as the trifoliate orange), which is closely enough related that it can still be hybridized with all other citrus and used as rootstock. These estimates are made using genetic mapping of plant chloroplasts. A DNA study published in Nature in 2018 concludes that the genus Citrus first evolved in the foothills of the Himalayas, in the area of Assam (India), western Yunnan (China), and northern Myanmar.

The three ancestral (sometimes characterized as "original" or "fundamental") species in the genus Citrus associated with modern Citrus cultivars are the mandarin orange, pomelo, and citron. Almost all of the common commercially important citrus fruits (sweet oranges, lemons, grapefruit, limes, and so on) are hybrids involving these three species with each other, their main progenies, and other wild Citrus species within the last few thousand years.

Fossil record 
A fossil leaf from the Pliocene of Valdarno (Italy) is described as †Citrus meletensis.
In China, fossil leaf specimens of †Citrus linczangensis have been collected from coal-bearing strata of the Bangmai Formation in the Bangmai village, about 10 km (6 miles) northwest of Lincang City, Yunnan. The Bangmai Formation contains abundant fossil plants and is considered to be of late Miocene age. Citrus linczangensis and C. meletensis share some important characters, such as an intramarginal vein, an entire margin, and an articulated and distinctly winged petiole.

Taxonomy 

The taxonomy and systematics of the genus are complex and the precise number of natural species is unclear, as many of the named species are hybrids clonally propagated through seeds (by apomixis), and genetic evidence indicates that even some wild, true-breeding species are of hybrid origin.

Most cultivated Citrus spp. seem to be natural or artificial hybrids of a small number of core ancestral species, including the citron, pomelo, mandarin, and papeda (see image). Natural and cultivated citrus hybrids include commercially important fruit such as oranges, grapefruit, lemons, limes, and some tangerines.

Apart from these core citrus species, Australian limes and the recently discovered mangshanyegan are grown. Kumquats and Clymenia spp. are now generally considered to belong within the genus Citrus. Trifoliate orange, which is often used as commercial rootstock, is an outgroup and may or may not be categorized as a citrus.

Phylogenetic analysis suggested the species of Oxanthera from New Caledonia, commonly known as false oranges, should be transferred to the genus Citrus. The transfer has been accepted.

Description

Tree 
The flowers are solitary or in small corymbs, each flower  diameter, with five (rarely four) white petals and numerous stamens; they are often very strongly scented, due to the presence of essential oil glands.

Fruit 
The outermost layer of the pericarp is an "exocarp" called the flavedo, commonly referred to as the zest. The middle layer of the pericarp is the mesocarp, which in citrus fruits consists of the white, spongy "albedo", or "pith". The innermost layer of the pericarp is the endocarp. The space inside each segment is a locule filled with juice vesicles, or "pulp". From the endocarp, string-like "hairs" extend into the locules, which provide nourishment to the fruit as it develops. Many citrus cultivars have been developed to be seedless (see nucellar embryony and parthenocarpy) and easy to peel.

Citrus fruits are notable for their fragrance, partly due to flavonoids and limonoids (which in turn are terpenes) contained in the rind, and most are juice-laden. The juice contains a high quantity of citric acid and other organic acids giving them their characteristic sharp flavour. The genus is commercially important as many species are cultivated for their fruit, which is eaten fresh, pressed for juice, or preserved in marmalades and pickles.

They are also good sources of vitamin C. The content of vitamin C in the fruit depends on the species, variety, and mode of cultivation.
The flavonoids include various flavanones and flavones.

Cultivation 

Citrus trees hybridise very readily – depending on the pollen source, plants grown from a Persian lime's seeds can produce fruit similar to grapefruit. Thus, all commercial citrus cultivation uses trees produced by grafting the desired fruiting cultivars onto rootstocks selected for disease resistance and hardiness.

The colour of citrus fruits only develops in climates with a (diurnal) cool winter. In tropical regions with no winter at all, citrus fruits remain green until maturity, hence the tropical "green oranges". The Persian lime in particular is extremely sensitive to cool conditions, thus it is not usually exposed to cool enough conditions to develop a mature colour. If they are left in a cool place over winter, the fruits will change colour to yellow.

The terms "ripe" and "mature" are usually used synonymously, but they mean different things. A mature fruit is one that has completed its growth phase. Ripening is the changes that occur within the fruit after it is mature to the beginning of decay. These changes usually involve starches converting to sugars, a decrease in acids, softening, and change in the fruit's colour.

Citrus fruits are nonclimacteric and respiration slowly declines and the production and release of ethylene is gradual. The fruits do not go through a ripening process in the sense that they become "tree ripe". Some fruits, for example cherries, physically mature and then continue to ripen on the tree. Other fruits, such as pears, are picked when mature, but before they ripen, then continue to ripen off the tree. Citrus fruits pass from immaturity to maturity to overmaturity while still on the tree. Once they are separated from the tree, they do not increase in sweetness or continue to ripen. The only way change may happen after being picked is that they eventually start to decay.

With oranges, colour cannot be used as an indicator of ripeness because sometimes the rinds turn orange long before the oranges are ready to eat. Tasting them is the only way to know whether they are ready to eat.

Citrus trees are not generally frost hardy. Tangerines, tangors and yuzu can be grown outside even in regions with more marked subfreezing temperatures in winter, although this may affect fruit quality. A few hardy hybrids can withstand temperatures well below freezing, but do not produce quality fruit. Lemons can be commercially grown in cooler-summer/moderate-winter, coastal Southern California, because sweetness is neither attained nor expected in retail lemon fruit. The related trifoliate orange (C. trifoliata) can survive below ; its fruit are astringent and inedible unless cooked, but a few better-tasting cultivars and hybrids have been developed (see citranges).

The trees thrive in a consistently sunny, humid environment with fertile soil and adequate rainfall or irrigation. Abandoned trees in valleys may suffer, yet survive, the dry summer of Central California's Inner Coast Ranges. At any age, citrus grows well enough with infrequent irrigation in partial shade, but the fruit crop is smaller. Being of tropical and subtropical origin, oranges, like all citrus, are broadleaved and evergreen. They do not drop leaves except when stressed. The stems of many varieties have large sharp thorns. The trees flower in the spring, and fruit is set shortly afterward. Fruit begins to ripen in fall or early winter, depending on cultivar, and develops increasing sweetness afterward. Some cultivars of tangerines ripen by winter. Some, such as the grapefruit, may take up to 18 months to ripen.

Production 

At US $15.2 billion equivalent in 2018, citrus trade makes up nearly half of the world fruit trade, which was US $32.1 billion for the same year. According to the United Nations Conference on Trade and Development (UNCTAD), citrus production grew during the early 21st century mainly by the increase in cultivation areas, improvements in transportation and packaging, rising incomes and consumer preference for healthy foods. In 2019–20, world production of oranges was estimated to be , led by Brazil, Mexico, the European Union, and China as the largest producers.

As ornamental plants 

Citrus trees grown in tubs and wintered under cover were a feature of Renaissance gardens, once glass-making technology enabled sufficient expanses of clear glass to be produced. An orangery was a feature of royal and aristocratic residences through the 17th and 18th centuries. The Orangerie at the Palace of the Louvre, 1617, inspired imitations that were not eclipsed until the development of the modern greenhouse in the 1840s. In the United States, the earliest surviving orangery is at the Tayloe House, Mount Airy, Virginia. George Washington had an orangery at Mount Vernon.

Some modern hobbyists still grow dwarf citrus in containers or greenhouses in areas where the weather is too cold to grow it outdoors. Consistent climate, sufficient sunlight, and proper watering are crucial if the trees are to thrive and produce fruit. Compared to many of the usual "green shrubs", citrus trees better tolerate poor container care. For cooler winter areas, limes and lemons should not be grown, since they are more sensitive to winter cold than other citrus fruits. Hybrids with kumquats (× Citrofortunella) have good cold resistance. A citrus tree in a container may have to be repotted every 5 years or so, since the roots may form a thick "root-ball" on the bottom of the pot.

Pests and diseases 

Citrus plants are very liable to infestation by aphids, whitefly, and scale insects (e.g. California red scale). Also rather important are the viral infections to which some of these ectoparasites serve as vectors such as the aphid-transmitted Citrus tristeza virus, which when unchecked by proper methods of control is devastating to citrine plantations. The newest threat to citrus groves in the United States is the Asian citrus psyllid.

The Asian citrus psyllid is an aphid-like insect that feeds on the leaves and stems of citrus trees and other citrus-like plants. The real danger lies in the fact that the psyllid can carry a deadly, bacterial tree disease called Huanglongbing (HLB), also known as citrus greening disease. Because  the causative bacteria are not culturable, evaluation of resistant cultivars and vectors is slow. There are some HLB-resistant and vector-resistant citrus strains known, and genetic engineering and new chemical controls have been proven in laboratory use and show promise for field use.

In August 2005, citrus greening disease was discovered in the south Florida region around Homestead and Florida City. The disease has since spread to every commercial citrus grove in Florida. In 2004–2005, USDA statistics reported the total Florida citrus production to be 169.1 million boxes of fruit. The estimate for all Florida citrus production in the 2015–2016 season is 94.2 million boxes, a 44.3% drop. Carolyn Slupsky, a professor of nutrition and food science at the University of California, Davis has said that "we could lose all fresh citrus within 10 to 15 years".

In June 2008, the psyllid was spotted dangerously close to California – right across the international border in Tijuana, Mexico. Only a few months later, it was detected in San Diego and Imperial Counties, and has since spread to Riverside, San Bernardino, Orange, Los Angeles and Ventura Counties, sparking quarantines in those areas. The Asian citrus psyllid has also been intercepted coming into California in packages of fruit and plants, including citrus, ornamentals, herbs and bouquets of cut flowers, shipped from other states and countries.

The foliage is also used as a food plant by the larvae of Lepidoptera (butterfly and moth) species such as the Geometridae common emerald (Hemithea aestivaria) and double-striped pug (Gymnoscelis rufifasciata), the Arctiidae giant leopard moth (Hypercompe scribonia), H. eridanus, H. icasia and H. indecisa, many species in the family Papilionidae (swallowtail butterflies), and the black-lyre leafroller moth ("Cnephasia" jactatana), a tortrix moth.

Since 2000, the citrus leafminer (Phyllocnistis citrella) has been a pest in California, boring meandering patterns through leaves.

In eastern Australia, the bronze-orange bug (Musgraveia sulciventris) can be a major pest of citrus trees, particularly grapefruit. In heavy infestations it can cause flower and fruit drop and general tree stress.

European brown snails (Cornu aspersum) can be a problem in California, though laying female Khaki Campbell and other mallard-related ducks can be used for control.

Deficiency diseases 
Citrus plants can also develop a deficiency condition called chlorosis, characterized by yellowing leaves highlighted by contrasting leaf veins. The shriveling leaves eventually fall, and if the plant loses too many, it will slowly die. This condition is often caused by an excessively high pH (alkaline soil), which prevents the plant from absorbing iron, magnesium, zinc, or other nutrients it needs to produce chlorophyll. This condition can be cured by adding an appropriate acidic fertilizer formulated for citrus, which can sometimes revive a plant to produce new leaves and even flower buds within a few weeks under optimum conditions. A soil which is too acidic can also cause problems; citrus prefers neutral soil (pH between 6 and 8). Citrus plants are also sensitive to excessive salt in the soil. Soil testing may be necessary to properly diagnose nutrient-deficiency diseases.

Uses

Culinary 
Many citrus fruits, such as oranges, tangerines, grapefruits, and clementines, are generally eaten fresh. They are typically peeled and can be easily split into segments. Grapefruit is more commonly halved and eaten out of the skin with a spoon. Special spoons (grapefruit spoons) with serrated tips are designed for this purpose. Orange and grapefruit juices are also popular breakfast beverages. More acidic citrus, such as lemons and limes, are generally not eaten on their own. Meyer lemons can be eaten out of hand with the fragrant skin; they are both sweet and sour. Lemonade or limeade are popular beverages prepared by diluting the juices of these fruits and adding sugar. Lemons and limes are also used in cooked dishes, or sliced and used as garnishes. Their juice is used as an ingredient in a variety of dishes; it can commonly be found in salad dressings and squeezed over cooked fish, meat, or vegetables.

A variety of flavours can be derived from different parts and treatments of citrus fruits. The rind and oil of the fruit is generally bitter, especially when cooked, so is often combined with sugar. The fruit pulp can vary from sweet to extremely sour. Marmalade, a condiment derived from cooked orange or lemon, can be especially bitter, but is usually sweetened with sugar to cut the bitterness and produce a jam-like result. Lemon or lime is commonly used as a garnish for water, soft drinks, or cocktails. Citrus juices, rinds, or slices are used in a variety of mixed drinks. The colourful outer skin of some citrus fruits, known as zest, is used as a flavouring in cooking; the white inner portion of the peel, the pith, is usually avoided due to its bitterness. The zest of a citrus fruit, typically lemon or an orange, can also be soaked in water in a coffee filter, and drunk.

Phytochemicals and research
Some Citrus species contain significant amounts of the phytochemical class called furanocoumarins, a diverse family of naturally occurring organic chemical compounds. In humans, some (not all) of these chemical compounds act as strong photosensitizers when applied topically to the skin, while other furanocoumarins interact with medications when taken orally. The latter is called the "grapefruit juice effect", a common name for a related group of grapefruit-drug interactions.

Due to the photosensitizing effects of certain furanocoumarins, some Citrus species are known to cause phytophotodermatitis, a potentially severe skin inflammation resulting from contact with a light-sensitizing botanical agent followed by exposure to ultraviolet light. In Citrus species, the primary photosensitizing agent appears to be bergapten, a linear furanocoumarin derived from psoralen. This claim has been confirmed for lime and bergamot. In particular, bergamot essential oil has a higher concentration of bergapten (3000–3600 mg/kg) than any other Citrus-based essential oil.

In general, three Citrus ancestral species (pomelos, citrons, and papedas) synthesize relatively high quantities of furanocoumarins, whereas a fourth ancestral species (mandarins) is practically devoid of these compounds. Since the production of furanocoumarins in plants is believed to be heritable, the descendants of mandarins (such as sweet oranges, tangerines, and other small mandarin hybrids) are expected to have low quantities of furanocoumarins, whereas other hybrids (such as limes, grapefruit, and sour oranges) are expected to have relatively high quantities of these compounds.

In most Citrus species, the peel contains a greater diversity and a higher concentration of furanocoumarins than the pulp of the same fruit. An exception is bergamottin, a furanocoumarin implicated in grapefruit-drug interactions, which is more concentrated in the pulp of certain varieties of pomelo, grapefruit, and sour orange.

One review of preliminary research on diets indicated that consuming citrus fruits was associated with a 10% reduction of risk for developing breast cancer.

List of citrus fruits 

The genus Citrus has been suggested to originate in the eastern Himalayan foothills. Prior to human cultivation, it consisted of just a few species, though the status of some as distinct species has yet to be confirmed:

 Citrus assamensis – ginger lime, from Assam and Bangladesh
 Citrus crenatifolia – species name is unresolved, from Sri Lanka
 Citrus japonica – kumquats, from East Asia ranging into Southeast Asia (sometimes separated into four-five Fortunella species)
 Citrus mangshanensis – species name is unresolved, from Hunan, China
 Citrus maxima – pomelo (pummelo, shaddock), from the Island Southeast Asia
 Citrus medica – citron, from India
 Citrus platymamma – byeonggyul, from Jeju Island, Korea
 Citrus reticulata – mandarin orange, from China
 Citrus trifoliata – trifoliate orange, from Korea and adjacent China (often separated as Poncirus)
 Australian limes
Citrus australasica – Australian finger lime
 Citrus australis – Australian round lime
 Citrus garrawayi – Mount White lime
 Citrus glauca – Australian desert lime
 Citrus gracilis – Kakadu lime or Humpty Doo lime
 Citrus inodora – Russel River lime and Maiden's Australian lime
 Citrus warburgiana – New Guinea wild lime
 Citrus wintersii – Brown River finger lime
 Papedas, including
Citrus halimii – limau kadangsa, limau kedut kera, from Thailand and Malaya
 Citrus hystrix – Kaffir lime, makrut, from Mainland Southeast Asia to Island Southeast Asia
 Citrus cavaleriei – Ichang papeda from southern China
 Citrus celebica – Celebes papeda
 Citrus indica – Indian wild orange, from the Indian subcontinent
 Citrus latipes – Khasi papeda, from Assam, Meghalaya, Burma
 Citrus longispina – Megacarpa papeda, winged lime, blacktwig lime
 Citrus macrophylla – Alemow
 Citrus macroptera – Melanesian papeda from Indochina to Melanesia
 Citrus micrantha, Citrus westeri – biasong or samuyao from the southern Philippines
 Citrus webberi – Kalpi, Malayan lemon

Hybrids and cultivars 

Sorted by parentage. As each hybrid is the product of (at least) two parent species, they are listed multiple times.

Citrus maxima-based Amanatsu, natsumikan – Citrus × natsudaidai (C. maxima × unknown)
 Cam sành – (C. reticulata × C. × sinensis)
 Dangyuja – (Citrus grandis Osbeck)
 Grapefruit – Citrus × paradisi (C. maxima × C. × sinensis)
 Haruka – Citrus tamurana x natsudaidai
 Hassaku orange – (Citrus hassaku)
 Ichang lemon – (Citrus wilsonii)
 Imperial lemon – (C. × limon × C. × paradisi)
 Kawachi Bankan – (Citrus kawachiensis)
 Kinnow – (C. × nobilis × C. × deliciosa)
 Kiyomi – (C. × sinensis × C. × unshiu)
 Minneola tangelo – (C. reticulata × C. × paradisi)
 Orangelo, Chironja – (C. × paradisi × C. × sinensis)
 Oroblanco, Sweetie – (C. maxima × C. × paradisi)
 Sweet orange – Citrus × sinensis (probably C. maxima × C. reticulata)
 Tangelo – Citrus × tangelo (C. reticulata × C. maxima or C. × paradisi)
 Tangor – Citrus × nobilis (C. reticulata × C. × sinensis)
 Ugli – (C. reticulata × C. maxima or C. × paradisi)Citrus medica-based Alemow, Colo – Citrus × macrophylla (C. medica × C. micrantha)
 Buddha's hand – Citrus medica var. sarcodactylus, a fingered citron.
 Citron varieties with sour pulp – Diamante citron, Florentine citron, Greek citron and Balady citron
 Citron varieties with sweet pulp – Corsican citron and Moroccan citron
 Etrog, a group of citron cultivars that are traditionally used for a Jewish ritual. Etrog is Hebrew for citron in general.
 Fernandina – Citrus × limonimedica (probably (C. medica × C. maxima) × C. medica)
 Ponderosa lemon – (probably (C. medica × C. maxima) × C. medica)
 Lemon – Citrus × limon (C. medica × C. × aurantium)
 Key lime, Mexican lime, Omani lime – Citrus × aurantiifolia (C. medica × C. micrantha)
 Persian lime, Tahiti lime – C. × latifolia (C. × aurantiifolia × C. × limon)
 Limetta, Sweet Lemon, Sweet Lime, mosambi – Citrus × limetta (C. medica × C. × aurantium)
 Lumia – several distinct pear shaped lemon-like hybrids.
 Pompia – Citrus medica tuberosa Risso & Poiteau, 1818 (C. medica × C. × aurantium), native to Sardinia, genetically synonymous with Rhobs el Arsa.
 Rhobs el Arsa – 'bread of the garden', C. medica × C. × aurantium, from Morocco.
 Yemenite citron – a pulpless true citron.Citrus reticulata–based Bergamot orange – Citrus × bergamia (C. × limon × C. × aurantium)
 Bitter orange, Seville Orange – Citrus × aurantium (C. maxima × C. reticulata)
 Blood orange – Citrus × sinensis cultivars
 Calamansi, Calamondin – (Citrus reticulata × Citrus japonica)
 Cam sành – (C. reticulata × C. × sinensis)
 Chinotto – Citrus × aurantium var. myrtifolia or Citrus × myrtifolia
 ChungGyun – Citrus reticulata cultivar
 Clementine – Citrus × clementina
 Cleopatra Mandarin – Citrus × reshni
 Siranui – Citrus reticulata cv. 'Dekopon' (ChungGyun × Ponkan)
 Daidai – Citrus ×aurantium var. daidai or Citrus × daidai
 Encore – ((Citrus reticulata x sinensis) x C. deliciosa)
 Grapefruit – Citrus ×paradisi (C. maxima × C. × sinensis)
 Hermandina – Citrus reticulata cv. 'Hermandina'
 Imperial lemon – ((C. maxima × C. medica) × C. ×paradisi)
 Iyokan, anadomikan – Citrus × iyo
 Jabara – (Citrus jabara)
 Kanpei – (Citrus reticulata 'Kanpei')
 Kinkoji unshiu – (Citrus obovoidea x unshiu)
 Kinnow, Wilking – (C. × nobilis × C. × deliciosa)
 Kishumikan – (Citrus kinokuni)
 Kiyomi – (C. sinensis × C. × unshiu)
 Kobayashi mikan – (Citrus natsudaidai x unshiu)
 Koji orange – (Citrus leiocarpa)
 Kuchinotsu No.37 – ('Kiyomi' x 'Encore')
 Laraha – 'C. × aurantium ssp. currassuviencis
 Mediterranean mandarin, Willow Leaf – Citrus × deliciosa
 Meyer lemon, Valley Lemon – Citrus × meyeri (C. medica × C. × sinensis)
 Michal mandarin – Citrus reticulata cv. 'Michal'
 Mikan, Satsuma – Citrus × unshiu
 Murcott – (C. reticulata x sinensis)
 Naartjie – (C. reticulata × C. nobilis)
 Nova mandarin, Clemenvilla
 Orangelo, Chironja – (C. × paradisi × C. ×s inensis)
 Oroblanco, Sweetie – (C. maxima × C. × paradisi)
  – Citrus × limettioides Tanaka (C. medica × C. × sinensis)
 Ponkan – Citrus reticulata cv. 'Ponkan'
 Rangpur, Lemanderin, Mandarin Lime – Citrus × limonia (C. reticulata × C. medica)
 Reikou – (Kuchinotsu No.37 x 'Murcott')
 Rough lemon – Citrus × jambhiri Lush. (C. reticulata × C. medica)
 Sanbokan – Citrus sulcata
 Setoka – (Kuchinotsu No.37 x 'Murcott')
 Shekwasha, Hirami Lemon, Taiwan Tangerine – Citrus × depressa
 Sunki, Suenkat – Citrus sunki or C. reticulata var. sunki
 Sweet orange – Citrus × sinensis (C. maxima × C. reticulata)
 Tachibana orange – Citrus tachibana (Mak.) Tanaka or C. reticulata var. tachibana
 Tangelo – Citrus × tangelo (C. reticulata × C. maxima or C. ×paradisi)
 Tangerine – Citrus × tangerina
 Tangor – Citrus × nobilis (C. reticulata × C. ×sinensis)
 Ugli – (C. reticulata × C. maxima or C. ×paradisi)
 Volkamer lemon – Citrus × volkameriana (C. reticulata × C. medica)
 Yukou – (Citrus yuko)
 Yuzu – Citrus × junos (C. reticulata × C. × cavaleriei)Other/Unresolved'''
 Djeruk limau – Citrus × amblycarpa Gajanimma, Carabao Lime – Citrus × pennivesiculata Hyuganatsu, Hyuganatsu pumelo – Citrus tamurana Ichang lemon – (C. cavaleriei × C. maxima)
 Kabosu – Citrus ×sphaerocarpa Odichukuthi – Citrus Odichukuthi from Malayalam
 Ougonkan – Citrus flaviculpus hort ex. Tanaka
 Sakurajima komikan orange
 Shonan gold – (Ougonkan) Citrus flaviculpus hort ex. Tanaka × (Imamura unshiu), Citrus unshiu Marc
 Sudachi – Citrus × sudachi''

For hybrids with kumquats, see citrofortunella. For hybrids with the trifoliate orange, see citrange.

See also 

 Citrus taxonomy
 Japanese citrus
 List of lemon dishes and beverages

References

External links 
 Effects of pollination on Citrus plants  Pollination of Citrus by Honey Bees
 Citrus Research and Education Center of IFAS (largest citrus research center in world)
 Citrus Variety Collection by the University of California
 Citrus (Mark Rieger, Professor of Horticulture, University of Georgia)
 Fundecitrus – Fund for Citrus Plant Protection is an organization of citrus Brazilian producers and processors.
 Citrus – taxonomy fruit anatomy at GeoChemBio
 

 
Cocktail garnishes
Garden plants
Citrus fruits
Lists of plants
Ornamental trees
Plants used in bonsai
Aurantioideae genera